Fatemeh Sharif (born 14 September 1986) is an Iranian futsal player and coach. She is the coach of Iran women's national futsal team.

Honours

National team
Coach of the national futsal team (2020)
Coach of the national women's youth futsal team (2015–2018)
(Third place in the women's national futsal team at the 2014 Victoria D-Russia tournament
Third place with the women's national futsal team in the 2013 Victory D-Russia tournament
Winning the championship with the women's national futsal team in the West Asia-Jordan 2007 tournament

References

External links 
 

1986 births
Living people
People from Razavi Khorasan Province
Iranian women's futsal players
Iranian futsal coaches